Congenital limb deformities are congenital musculoskeletal disorders which primarily affect the upper and lower limbs.

An example is polydactyly, where a foot or hand has more than 5 digits.

Clubfoot, one of the most common congenital deformities of the lower limbs, occurs approximately 1 in 1000 births. It can be treated by physical therapy, or by a combination of physical therapy and surgery.

One class of congenital limb deformities, limb reduction defects, occurs when one or more limbs are undersized or missing parts. The prevalence of these defects in the United States is approximately 1 in 1900 births. This category includes amelia, ectrodactyly, radial dysplasia, and phocomelia among others. These defects are more likely to be unilateral than bilateral, more likely to affect the upper limbs than lower limbs, and are associated with complex genetic syndromes about 10% of the time.

A wide variety of abnormalities of the hands and feet, including the nails and the creases of the hand, have been described and differentiated. Many of these abnormalities do not have an impact on function but may be useful in diagnosing genetic syndromes; for example, the single transverse palmar crease is commonly associated with Down syndrome.

References

Congenital disorders of musculoskeletal system